Jamaine Winborne (born December 26, 1980) is a professional American football cornerback free agent. He was signed by the New York Giants as an undrafted free agent in 2004. He played college football at Virginia.

Winborne has also played for the NFL's Baltimore Ravens and the Montreal Alouettes of the Canadian Football League.

Early years
He attended Indian River High School, in Chesapeake, Virginia, playing for the school's football team, which won the VHSL state championship in 1995.

External links
Baltimore Ravens bio

1980 births
Living people
Sportspeople from Chesapeake, Virginia
American football cornerbacks
American football safeties
Canadian football defensive backs
American players of Canadian football
Virginia Cavaliers football players
New York Giants players
Baltimore Ravens players
Montreal Alouettes players
Cologne Centurions (NFL Europe) players